CLARK the band was a Canadian indie rock band operating out of Ottawa, Ontario, Canada.

History
The band was formed in Ottawa in 1999 by John Tielli who sang, played guitar and composed. Initially named simply "Clark", the group began using the name "CLARK the band" to differentiate themselves from other similarly named bands.

The group's roster changed throughout its existence; Tielli was the only consistent member. Primary members also included Matt Gagnon on bass and vocals, Mike Dubue on keyboards and vocals, Philip Shaw Bova on drums, Andrew McCormack on drums, Jeremy Gara on drums, Tim Kingsbury on bass and vocals, Vish Khanna on drums, Robin Buckley on drums, Dan Neill on drums, vocals and keyboards, Ryan Myshrall on bass, Jordy Walker on drums and Corwin Fox on bass and vocals.

In 2000, the band released a three-song EP titled Clark.

In 2001, the group release its full-length debut, Terra Incognito: By Land, Sea and Air. It received positive reviews from the Ottawa Citizen, Eye Weekly, and CBC Radio's Bandwidth. Reviewer Kevin Jagernauth called Clark's combination of rock  with eighties keyboard pop refreshing.

The album The Woods, released in 2005, combined Tielli's distinctive vocal style with pop and rock metal instrumentation.

The group disbanded in 2007. Tielli has since moved to Toronto and formed the group Metal Kites.

Discography

See also

Music of Canada
Canadian rock
List of bands from Canada
List of Canadian musicians
:Category:Canadian musical groups

References

External links
Official site of Zunior Label
Official site of Metal Kites
CLARK the band on MySpace

Musical groups established in 1999
Musical groups disestablished in 2007
Canadian indie rock groups
Musical groups from Ottawa
1999 establishments in Ontario
2007 disestablishments in Ontario